Susanne Georgi Nielsen (born 27 July 1976 in Sjølund), commonly known as Susanne Georgi, is a Danish singer who lives and works in Andorra and represented the country in the Eurovision Song Contest 2009.

Career
Georgi started her career along with her sister in the duo Me & My, the group had a couple of hits around Europe. They also participated in the Danish pre-selection for Eurovision Song Contest 2007 together, in the end landing a 6th place in the national final. She has stated on her official MySpace that she is currently recording her fourth album.

Georgi is the owner of the biggest singing academy in Andorra; Stars Academy. She also runs a management and recording studio to help new talents on the way.

Eurovision 2009 
Susanne represented Andorra in the Eurovision Song Contest 2009 in Moscow, Russia with the song "La teva decisió (Get a Life)". The results of the national final in Andorra showed that she had received 47% of the jury vote and 66% of the public televote.  The song however failed to make it to the final of Eurovision the same year, losing out in the first semi-final.  It was not the first time Susanne has made an appearance in Eurovision, at the Eurovision Song Contest 2007 she presented the Danish televoting results at the Final in Helsinki. She has been working extensively since to bring Andorra back to the contest since her appearance in the contest.

Personal life
Georgi got married on 10 September 2011.
Susanne and Xavier Puigcercos has two daughters, Molly Puigcercos Georgi (2010) and Shelly Puigcercos Georgi (2012). In 2019, Molly was a contestant of the Spanish version of The Voice Kids broadcast on Antena 3.

Susanne arrived in Andorra in 1995 and has since lived there. She can speak  Catalan, Danish, English, Spanish and German.

References

External links
 Danmarks Radio profile

1976 births
Living people
Eurovision Song Contest entrants for Andorra
Andorran women singers
Danish emigrants to Andorra
People from Kolding Municipality
Eurovision Song Contest entrants of 2009
21st-century Danish women singers
Spanish-language singers of Denmark